Chaouki Ben Khader (born 2 February 2001) is a Tunisian professional football player who plays for US Ben Guerdane.

Club career 
Chaouki Ben Khader made his professional debut for US Ben Guerdane on the 26 May 2019, starting as center forward in the Ligue Pro 1 against CS Hammam-Lif.

International career 
With Tunisia U20, Ben Khader reached the U20 CAN semifinals in 2021.

References

External links

2001 births
Living people
Tunisian footballers
Tunisia youth international footballers
Tunisian Ligue Professionnelle 1 players
Association football forwards
US Ben Guerdane players